Centennial Airlines was founded in Laramie, Wyoming and began operations on June 15, 1981, with an initial route linking Denver to Laramie and Worland, Wyoming using a single Cessna 414 aircraft. The carrier flew until June 15, 1987, when it was merged into Mesa Airlines. Centennial was first based in Laramie, Wyoming, moved its offices to Worland, then to Cheyenne for a brief time in 1982, then back to Worland.

Destinations
 Denver, Colorado
 Billings, Montana,
 Logan 
 Salt Lake City
 Casper
 Cheyenne
 Cody
 Jackson
 Lander
 Laramie
 Rawlins
 Riverton
 Rock Springs 
 Worland

Routes operated include
Denver-Casper-Cody,
Denver-Cheyenne-Rawlins,
Denver-Rock Springs-Lander-Worland,
Denver-Laramie-Riverton-Worland-Cody-Billings,
Salt Lake City-Logan-Riverton-Worland-Cody

See also 
 List of defunct airlines of the United States

Fleet
 2 Beechcraft 1900s 
 1 Beechcraft 99 at the time of its merger with Mesa Airlines.

References

Defunct airlines of the United States
Airlines established in 1981
Airlines disestablished in 1987
Airlines based in Wyoming